Fineshade Priory was a priory of Augustinian Canons Regular in Northamptonshire, England.

It was founded  before 1208 by Richard Engayne (Engain), Lord of Blatherwycke on the site of a small castle and dissolved in 1536.

The buildings were granted to Lord Russell 1541/2. Sir Robert Kirkham bought it in 1545 and converted the west range into a country residence, which was demolished along with the remains of the priory in 1749.

A house was subsequently built on the site but demolished in 1956. The stable block remains, converted to a residence.

Fineshade Wood is part of Rockingham Forest. The civil parish has merged with Duddington.

References

Further reading
 Friends of Fineshade website http://www.fineshade.org.uk/abbey
 Rockingham Forest Trust
 Lost Heritage

Monasteries in Northamptonshire
Augustinian monasteries in England
1208 establishments in England
Christian monasteries established in the 13th century
1536 disestablishments in England
Buildings and structures demolished in 1749